Alienochelys ("strange turtle") is an extinct genus of sea turtle known from Maastrichian-aged Cretaceous phosphates in Morocco. Its name comes from, unlike other sea turtles, Alienochelys' the jaws being adapted for a powerful crushing pattern, as well as its unusual cranial characteristics. It is a relative of the modern leatherback turtle, as well as the extinct Archelon.

References 

Late Cretaceous turtles
Chelonioidea
Mesozoic reptiles of Africa
Extinct turtles